The Danville, Hazleton and Wilkes-Barre Railroad, also called the D.H. & W.B. Railroad, was a railroad in northeastern Pennsylvania. It ran from Sunbury to Tomhicken, a total of 43.44 miles plus 10.1 miles of branch lines, making the whole railroad 53.54 miles long. The railroad was completed in 1870. As of 2010, the Danville, Hazleton and Willkes-Barre Railroad tracks belong to the Pennsylvania Railroad.

History
The Danville, Hazleton and Wilkes-Barre Railroad began in April 1859 as the Wilkes-Barre and Pittston Railroad. Their plan was to build a railroad along the east side of the Susquehanna River from above Pittston to Danville or Sunbury. It was renamed the Danville, Hazleton, and Wilkes-Barre Railroad in 1867. Railroad construction began in late 1867 or early 1868. Simon P. Kase was a critical force in the building of the railroad. In 1870 an anthracite-burning locomotive was built for the railroad. By 1870, the Danville, Hazleton, and Wilkes-Barre Railroad linked Sunbury and Danville. By 1871, the railroad extended 43 miles from Sunbury to Tomhicken. In 1872, the Philadelphia and Erie Railroad started to operate the Danville, Hazleton and Wilkes-Barre tracks. In 1878, the railroad was sold under foreclosure and the name was changed to the Sunbury, Hazleton and Wilkes-Barre Railroad.

Financial information
In 1888, the railroad's president was J. N. DuBarry, the secretary was Albert Hewson, and the treasurer was Taber Ashton. Many of the officers and directors of the railroad lived in Philadelphia at that time.

By 1887, the total cost of the Danville, Hazleton and Wilkes-Barre Railroad was $3,535,109. At this time, they had 20,000 shares of stock each being worth $50. Their total funded debt was $2,535,000.

Route
Sunbury was the railroad's western terminus. Proceeding east, the route passed through Danville and terminated at Tomhicken. There were an additional  of branch lines.

In 1888, the D.H. & W.B. railroad, then named the Sunbury, Hazleton and Wilkes-Barre Railroad, comprised 25 bridges and trestles totalling  in length. These consisted of ten wooden bridges totalling , three stone bridges totalling , six iron bridges totalling , and six wooden trestles totalling .

The D.H. & W.B. was laid on white oak ties and had stone cinder and culm ballast. As of 1888, the railroad had 32 at-grade highway crossings, one highway that went over the railroad, and two that went under it. None of these crossings were gated.

Stations and intersections
In 1871, the Lehigh Valley Railroad connected with the D.H. & W.B. in Tomhicken. The Catawissa Railroad (which later became part of the Reading Railroad) crossed the D.H. & W.B. The Philadelphia and Erie Railroad crossed the D.H. & W.B. at Sunbury.

There were a total of five railroad stations along the route. The stations included Mountain Grove Campground, halfway between Bloomsburg and Hazleton, and Mainville.

Uses
The Danville, Hazleton and Wilkes-Barre Railroad helped provide coal access to the market. The railroad was also used to transport furniture and other supplies to the Mountain Grove Campground. The railroad also carried cars full of worshipers to the Mountain Grove Campground, and sometimes even ran especially for them. In the campground's later years, the Danville, Hazleton and Wilkes-Barre Railroad carried such items as bands to the campground. The railroad provided a direct path from Sunbury to Danville, and aided communication between Danville and Sunbury. The railroad established an alternative route from the Lehigh Valley Railroad's Hazleton Branch to Sunbury.

See also
 Bloomsburg and Sullivan Railroad
 Susquehanna, Bloomsburg, and Berwick Railroad
 Lackawanna and Bloomsburg Railroad
 List of Pennsylvania railroads
 Catawissa Railroad

Notes

References

4 ft 9 in gauge railways in the United States
Defunct Pennsylvania railroads
1867 establishments in Pennsylvania
1878 disestablishments